D-Day: A Gangsta Grillz Album is the fourth compilation album by American record label Dreamville. It was released on March 31, 2022, by Dreamville and Interscope as a Gangsta Grillz mixtape hosted by DJ Drama. 

D-Day includes contributions from Dreamville artists, J. Cole, Bas, Cozz, Omen, Lute, Ari Lennox, JID, and EarthGang. The mixtape features guest appearances from 2 Chainz, ASAP Ferg, Kenny Mason, Sheck Wes, G Perico, Reason, and Young Nudy.

Background
The mixtape is the fourth compilation by Dreamville, following Revenge of the Dreamers III (2019). It is also the second Dreamville release to be hosted by DJ Drama, following JID's album DiCaprio 2 (2018).

Recording and production
Ibrahim Hamad revealed that the idea of this compilation album came from Barry Hefner in nine days, and was turned in and cleared by Interscope the day before it released. "Jozi Flows" was first recorded in 2019 during the Revenge of the Dreamers III sessions in Atlanta, and was finished in 2022 in Johannesburg and named after the city.

Singles and promotion
On September 21, 2021, J. Cole released a freestyle titled "Heaven's EP", remixing the beat of "Pipe Down" from Drake's Certified Lover Boy. 

On September 27, the label announced the second annual Dreamville Festival in Raleigh, North Carolina. The festival took place from April 2-3, including performances from all of Dreamville's artists as well as DJ Drama, Lil Wayne, Jeezy, T.I., Lil Baby, T-Pain, WizKid, Ja Rule, Ashanti, Kehlani, Moneybagg Yo, Wiz Khalifa, Wale, Morray, Fivio Foreign, Blxst, among others.

On March 30, 2022, the mixtape was announced via social media, to be released ahead of the Dreamville Festival.

Critical reception
Writing for Vibe, Preezy Brown said the mixtape "captures Dreamville in the midst of their free-wheeling flow of creativity, which has accounted for some of the best compilations from a label or collective in recent memory. While not as explosive as previous offerings like Revenge of the Dreamers III, D-Day is a quality mix of selections that may not place Cole and company on the Gangsta Grillz Mt. Rushmore but is indicative of their stature as one of the most formidable, self-contained crews in music today."

Track listing

Sample credits
 "Coming Down" contains a sample of "I'm Going Down" as performed by Rose Royce.
 "Blackberry Sap" contains a sample of "Love Over and Over Again" as performed by Switch.
 "Big Trouble Freestyle" contains a sample of "Who Shot Ya?" as performed by The Notorious B.I.G.
 "Heaven's EP" contains a sample of "Pipe Down" as performed by Drake.

Charts

References

2022 mixtape albums
Dreamville Records albums
J. Cole albums
Albums produced by J. Cole
Record label compilation albums
Interscope Records compilation albums